Solčava (German: Sulzbach) is a village in the Upper Savinja Valley in northern Slovenia close to the Austrian border. It is the largest settlement and the seat of the Municipality of Solčava. Traditionally it belonged to the region of Styria and is now included in the Savinja Statistical Region.

Name
Solčava was attested in written sources as Sulçpach in 1268 (and as Sulzpach in 1306 and Sulzbach in 1491). In the local dialect, the village is called Žocpah, and in the 19th century its Slovene name was recorded as Žolcpah, Sušpach, and Solcpah—all based on the German name. The German name is a compound corresponding to Sulze 'mineral springs' + Bach 'creek', referring to the local geography. The modern Slovene name Solčava was artificially created in the 19th century from the German name; the first half of the name was modified to Šolč- to appear more Slovene, and the second half was replaced with -ava, a common suffix associated with streams.

Church

The parish church in the settlement is dedicated to Mary of the Snows. It dates to the 15th century and contains a 13th-century statue of the Virgin Mary. It belongs to the Roman Catholic Diocese of Celje.

References

External links

Solčava on Geopedia

Populated places in the Municipality of Solčava